The Dawn of the Empire is a South Korean historical television series which aired on KBS1 from March 2, 2002 to January 26, 2003 for 94 episodes every weekend at 21:45 (KST). It revolves around the reigns of the second, third and fourth king of Goryeo, particularly on the latter, Gwangjong's.

Cast

Main
Kim Sang-joong as King Gwangjong
4th ruler of Goryeo
Jun Hye-jin as Queen Daemok
Gwangjong's primary wife, formerly half-sister
Choi Jae-sung as King Jeongjong
3rd ruler of Goryeo
Hong Ri-na as Queen Mungong
Jeongjong's 1st wife
Kim Min-woo as Crown Prince Wang Ju
Gwangjong and Daemok's son

Supporting

Royal household
Around Taejo
Choi Soo-jong and Lee Moon-soo as King Taejo (cameo)
Ban Hyo-jung as Lady Oh, Queen Janghwa
Taejo's 2nd wife and Hyejong's mother
Jung Young-sook as Lady Yoo, Queen Sinmyeong
Taejo's 3rd wife, Jeongjong and Gwangjong's mother
Ahn Hae-sook as Lady Hwangbo, Queen Sinjeong
Taejo's 4th wife, Daejong and Daemok's mother
Han Bok-hee as Lady Dongyangwon
Seo Mi-ae as Lady Sogwangwon
Jung Gook-jin as King Daejong
Daemok's older brother
Lee Kan-hee as Princess Naknang
Kim Bu's 2nd wife and Taejo's oldest daughter
Go Dong-hyun as Prince Hyoeun
Park Jin-hyung as young Prince Hyoeun
Kim Gwang-young as Prince Wonnyeong
Choi Sung-min as Prince Hyoseong

Around Hyejong
Noh Young-gook as King Hyejong
2nd ruler of Goryeo
Kim Hyun-joo as Queen Uihwa
Hyejong's primary wife
Kang Kyung-hun as Lady Hugwangjuwon
Oh Ji-young as Lady Cheongjuwon
Kim Min-kyung as Lady Gyeonghwa
Jang Han-na as young Lady Gyeonghwa
Hyejong and Uihwa's daughter who become Gwangjong's 2nd wife.
Kim Gyu-min as Prince Heunghwa
Seo Hyun-suk as young Prince Heunghwa
Hyejong and Uihwa's son

Around Jeongjong
Kim Hyo-joo as Queen Munseong
Mungong's younger sister
Do Ji-young as Lady Cheongjunamwon
Cheongjuwon's younger sister
Kim Min-woo as Prince Gyeongchunwon
Sung Nak-man as young Prince Gyeongchunwon
Jeongjong and Munseong's only son

People in Silla
Lee Do-ryun as Kim Bu, Duke Jungsung
The last ruler of Silla

Officials and nobles
Kim Heung-ki as Wang Sik-ryeom, Taejo's cousin and Jeongjong's supporter
Min-Wook as Wang Yuk
Jo Kyung-hwan as Park Sul-hee, Hyejong's supporter
Kim Mu-saeng as Ham Gyu, later Wang Gyu
Baek In-chul as Yeom Sang
Kim Sang-soon as Park Yeong-gyu, Mungong and Munseong's father
Jung Dong-hwan as Choi Ji-mong
Jung Sang-chul as Park Su-gyeong
Kim Young-in as Park Su-mun
Lee Hyo-jung as Shuang Ji (Ssang Gi)
Lee Ji-hyung as Choi Seung-ro
Jung Woon-yong as Wang Yung
Park Seung-gyoo as Shin Gang
Kwon Hyuk-ho as Kwon Shin
Han Bum-hee as Seo Hui
Lee Dae-ro as Seo Pil, Seo Hui's father
Lee Jae-yun as Lee Mong-yu
Byun Hee-bong as Kim Geung-ryul
Kim Soo-il as Ryu Cheon-gung
Heo Hyun-ho as Yu Geung-dal, Queen Sinmyeong's father
Kim Gi-bok as Hwangbo Sung
Heo Gi-ho as Kim Yeong
Choi Hun-chul as Shin Jil
Jang Gi-yong as Jang Yu
Choi Sung-joon as Wang Ham-yun
Park Gyung-deuk as Kang Gi-ju
Jung-Wook as Ham Soon
Maeng Bong-hak as So Mu-gae
Yang Jae-sung as Ssang Cheol
Yoo Byung-han as Wang Seung
Kim Sung-ok as Kwon Jik
Park Jung-woong as Mister Hwangbo
Park Young-tae as Hwangbo Gwang-gyeom
Kim Joo-young as Kim Gyeon-sul
Lee Han-seung as Im Hui
Park Jin-sung as Yu Shin-sung
Song Geum-shik as Jang Dan-seol
Shin Dong-hoon as Hwangbo Wi-gwang
Im Byung-gi as Choi Haeng-gwi
Lee Dae-gun as Choi Seom
Nam Il-woo as Kim Ak
Won Suk-yun as Wang Ham-min
Nam Young-jin as Han Hyeon-gyu
Lee Yong-jin as Park Seung-wi
Park Yoo-seung as Park Seung-gyeong
Shin Dong-il as Park Seung-rye
Lee Gye-young as Son So
Na Jae-gyoon as Seol Mun-u
Cha Gi-hwan as Shik Hoi
Oh Seung-myung as Myeong Cheon-gong
Lee Jong-man as Ju Sul-sa
Im Gyung-ok as Cho Seon

People in Goguryeo
Kim Dae-hwan as Yang Man-choon
Im Sun-taek as Yeon Gaesomoon

Buddhist monk
Jung-Wook as Tanmun, Gyunyeo's teacher
Jung Seung-ho as Gyunyeo

People in Huju
Kim Gi-jin as Yeo Gye-bin
Lee Hyo-jung as Ssang-gi
Yang Jae-sung as Ssang-chul

People in Eastern Jurchen
Gook Jung-hwan as Yoonsun
Maeng Bong-hak as So Moo-gae
Park Hee-jin as Ma Si-jeo
Kim Kang-il as Mo Il-la
Jo Jung-gook as Sa Ga-moon

People in Tang dynasty
Kim Hong-soo as Emperor Taizong (Korean: Taejong)
Jung Jong-joon as Lee Se-jeok
Jang Soon-gook as Qibi Heli (Korean: Seolpil Haryeok)

Extended cast
Lee Dong-joon as a left general
Lee Won-bal as a right general
Oh Seung-myung as a fortune teller
Shin Won-gyoon as a military officer
Hwang Duk-jae as a military officer
Oh Hyun-soo as Gwangjong's general
Lee Il-woong as Cho-Seon's head assistant
Seo Young-jin as Cho-Seon's people
Kang Shin-jo as a rebel commander
Kim Chang-bong as Taejo's eunuch
Min Gyung-jin as Gwangjong's eunuch
Park Joon-ah as Queen Janghwa's court lady
Park Jong-sul as the people
Han Choon-il as the people
Lee Chul-min as a flat shooter

Awards and nominations

External links
 

2002 South Korean television series debuts
2003 South Korean television series endings
Korean Broadcasting System television dramas
Korean-language television shows
Television series set in Goryeo
South Korean historical television series
Television series set in the 10th century
Television shows set in Kaesong